Fushifarurah as a place name may refer to:
 Fushifarurah (Lhaviyani Atoll) (Republic of Maldives)
 Fushifarurah (Shaviyani Atoll) (Republic of Maldives)
 Fushifarurah (Alif Alif Atoll), a disappeared island of the (Republic of Maldives)